Lepidobatrachus asper (common name: Paraguay horned frog; in Spanish: escuerzo) is a species of frog in the family Ceratophryidae. It is found in the Chaco of northern Argentina, Mato Grosso do Sul in Brazil, and Paraguay.

This frog inhabits dry scrubland and semi-arid areas. Breeding takes place in temporary pools and water tanks on cattle farms. During the dry season these frogs burrow underground, only to emerge again after rain. It can be threatened by fires, potentially also by over-grazing livestock.

References

asper
Amphibians of Argentina
Amphibians of Brazil
Amphibians of Paraguay
Amphibians described in 1899
Taxonomy articles created by Polbot